Bathyechiniscus tetronyx is a species of tardigrades. It is the only species of the genus Bathyechiniscus, which belongs to the family Styraconyxidae. The species and genus were named by Gotthold Steiner in 1926. The species has been found in the Davis Sea, on the eastern coast of Antarctica.

References

Further reading
Steiner, 1926 : Bathyechiniscus tetronyx n. g. n. sp. ein neuer mariner Tardigrade. [Bathyechiniscus tetronyx n. g. n. sp., A New Underwater Tardigrade] German Southern Polar Expedition (Deutsche Sudpolar Expedition), vol. 18, p. 479-481

Styraconyxidae
Fauna of Antarctica
Animals described in 1926